Kei Ling Ha is an area of Shap Sze Heung, on the Sai Kung Peninsula, in eastern New Territories of Hong Kong. Administratively, it is part of Tai Po District. It is a popular place for countryside visits, picnicking and bird watching.

Location
Kei Ling Ha is located at the coastal area near Sai Sha Road, at the junction of Ma On Shan Country Park and Sai Kung West Country Park. It is located in the innermost shore of Three Fathoms Cove which is known as Kei Ling Ha Hoi indigenously.

Villages
Kei Ling Ha Lo Wai and Kei Ling Ha San Wai are the two main villages within this area. Kei Ling Ha Lo Wai is a Hakka walled village. Both villages are occupied by members of the Ho lineage.

The settlement of Kei Ling Ha Lo Wai probably dates back to the late 16th century. The New Village branched off from the "old Wai" around 1876. The combined population of the two villages was 135 in 1960.

As a walled village, Kei Ling Ha Lo Wai features an entrance gate and a Ho Ancestral Hall. A drystone wall marks the outer edge of the village platform on a piedmont site. The site faces almost directly north so that the wall has a most likely a geomantic as well as a practical function.

Kei Ling Ha Lo Wai and Kei Ling Ha San Wai are recognized villages under the New Territories Small House Policy.

Ecology
Kei Ling Ha is the site of a rocky shore. Mangrove can be found at Kei Ling Ha Lo Wai, and the site has been a Site of Special Scientific Interest since 1994. It is the habitat of fiddler crabs.

Transport
Kei Ling Ha is served by Sai Sha Road. The end of Stage 3 and start of Stage 4 of the MacLehose Trail is located at Shui Long Wo, part of Kei Ling Ha.

See also
 Environment of Hong Kong
 List of places in Hong Kong
 Walled villages of Hong Kong
 List of villages in Hong Kong

References

External links

 Delineation of area of existing village Kei Ling Ha Lo Wai (Sai Kung North) for election of resident representative (2019 to 2022)
 Delineation of area of existing village Kei Ling Ha San Wai (Sai Kung North) for election of resident representative (2019 to 2022)

Villages in Tai Po District, Hong Kong
Sai Kung North
Walled villages of Hong Kong